Michael Dickson (born 3 September 1975) is an Australian alpine skier. He competed in the men's slalom at the 2002 Winter Olympics.

References

External links
 

1975 births
Living people
Australian male alpine skiers
Olympic alpine skiers of Australia
Alpine skiers at the 2002 Winter Olympics
Skiers from Sydney